Neotorularia is a genus of flowering plants belonging to the family Brassicaceae.

Its native range is Western and South Mediterranean to Mongolia and Arabian Peninsula.

Species:

Neotorularia aculeolata 
Neotorularia brevipes 
Neotorularia contortuplicata 
Neotorularia dentata 
Neotorularia eldarica 
Neotorularia grubovii 
Neotorularia rossica 
Neotorularia tetracmoides 
Neotorularia torulosa

References

Brassicaceae
Brassicaceae genera